Oedignatha retusa is a species of spider of the genus Oedignatha endemic to Sri Lanka.

See also
 List of Liocranidae species

References

Liocranidae
Endemic fauna of Sri Lanka
Spiders of Asia
Spiders described in 1897